Stigmella cassiniae is a moth of the family Nepticulidae. It is found in New Zealand.

The length of the forewings is 2–3 mm. Adults have been recorded in January, February, April and October. Reared moths emerged August, September and November. There are probably two generations per year.

The larvae feed on Cassinia species. They mine the leaves of their host plant. The mine is circular in the early stage, later occupying entire the leaflet. The larvae then mine through the stem to another nearby leaflet. Up to five leaflets may be consumed before the larva matures. Larva have been recorded in May, July, August and October. They are 2–3 mm long and orange-brown. The cocoon is spun amongst debris on the ground.

References 

Nepticulidae
Moths of New Zealand
Endemic fauna of New Zealand
Moths described in 1989
Endemic moths of New Zealand